The General Intelligence Service or Directorate of General Intelligence Service is the intelligence service of the federal government of Sudan, created in July 2019 from the former National Intelligence and Security Service (Jihaaz Al Amn Wal Mukhaabaraat Al Watani, NISS) by the Transitional Military Council during the Sudanese Revolution in response to demands from protestors to close down NISS because of its role in repression.

NISS

During the Omar al-Bashir presidency, the National Intelligence and Security Service was an incredibly powerful body. It was granted extensive powers by the National Security Acts of 1999 and 2010 such as the ability of to reposes livestock and was frequently referred to as a secret police organization.

It is widely accepted that in addition to its domestic operations, the NISS ran operations and agents throughout the Middle East, North Africa and Western Europe. The secretive organisation's most well known operation was its massive intelligence network in Iraq, which it was able to build by recruiting foreign fighters passing through Khartoum on their way to Iraq.

From 2004 to 2009, NISS was led by Salah Gosh. Gosh was removed as leader by President Al-Bashir and replaced with Mohammed Atta al-Moula, the deputy director of the service at the time, who led it until Gosh's reappointment in 2018.

The NISS operated the Rapid Support Forces.

On 13 April 2019 during the 2019 Sudanese coup d'état, Gosh, who was reappointed NISS Director in 2018 and was a controversial figure, was sacked as head of the agency after Abdel Fattah Abdelrahman Burhan, the head of the newly created Transitional Military Council (TMC) accepted his resignation. On 14 April 2019, Lieutenant General Abu Bakr Mustafa was named as Gosh's successor.

Creation of GIS
NISS was heavily involved in the repression of protestors during the Sudanese Revolution of 2018–2019, in response to which protestors called for NISS to be dissolved. While the TMC still held power as the de facto executive power in Sudan, in July, it issued Constitutional Decree No. (33) of 2019, in which NISS was renamed as the General Intelligence Service. Official reasons cited for the name change included "[coping] with the political change in the country" and "[becoming] more professional in protecting the country and safeguarding its national security against very complicated threats".

January 2020 mutiny
According to The Washington Post, most of the former NISS agents chose neither to remain in GIS nor to accept the option to join alternative Sudanese armed services, and instead to accept a monetary package. On 14 January 2020, several of the former NISS agents, angry at the reduced value of the severance, mutinied. Government security forces regained control of the rebelling former NISS employees within several hours. Hemetti of the Sovereignty Council attributed responsibility for the mutiny to former NISS head Salah Gosh, and stated that the mutiny should not be considered to be a coup attempt. The Washington Post interpreted the incident as "probably a haphazard show of anger by frustrated corps members who are now out of a job, rather than an attempt to overthrow the regime." The head of GIS, Abu Bakr Mustafa, resigned as a result of the event.

References

Intelligence agencies
Secret police
Government agencies of Sudan